ODPS may refer to:

 Ohio Department of Public Safety
 Oklahoma Department of Public Safety